Mario Tadejević (born 28 August 1989) is a Croatian football defender who plays for Orijent 1919 in the Croatian Second Football League.

Career
He started his professional career in 2007 with Rijeka in Croatia’s Prva HNL and was with the club until 2012. This included a loan to Pomorac in Croatia's Druga HNL during one of the seasons. He later had a three-year spell in Iceland with Fjölnir.

References

External links
 

1989 births
Living people
Footballers from Rijeka
Association football fullbacks
Croatian footballers
HNK Rijeka players
NK Pomorac 1921 players
FK Sarajevo players
Pécsi MFC players
FK Velež Mostar players
NK Krk players
Ungmennafélagið Fjölnir players
HNK Orijent players
Croatian Football League players
Premier League of Bosnia and Herzegovina players
Nemzeti Bajnokság I players
Úrvalsdeild karla (football) players
First Football League (Croatia) players
Croatian expatriate footballers
Croatian expatriate sportspeople in Hungary
Expatriate footballers in Hungary
Croatian expatriate sportspeople in Bosnia and Herzegovina
Expatriate footballers in Bosnia and Herzegovina
Croatian expatriate sportspeople in Iceland
Expatriate footballers in Iceland